Pain Court (often incorrectly spelled Paincourt) is a primarily French-speaking agricultural village in southwestern Ontario, Canada, in the municipality of Chatham-Kent. It was established in 1854, as one of the earliest French-speaking settlements in southern Ontario. Pain Court was founded when English and French-speaking squatters from the Detroit, Michigan, area began to settle the indigenous lands along the lower Thames River in the region in the 1780s. It derived its name from the small loaves of bread which the impoverished parishioners offered to Roman Catholic missionaries.

By the 1820s in the nearby "Pain Court Block", one of the earliest French-speaking (Franco-Ontarian) communities in southern Ontario had developed. Named Pain Court (literally meaning "short bread") by Catholic missionaries in reference to the small loaves of bread which was all the impoverished parishioners could offer, the settlement was surveyed in 1829. In 1852 a chapel was built and two years later construction of a church commenced. It quickly became the cultural and educational centre of French-speaking Catholics in the area. By 1866 when a post office was established, a small village had developed.

Joseph Caron, the former Canadian diplomat, was raised in Pain Court.  He served as Canada’s ambassador to China (2001 to 2005), with concurrent accreditation to North Korea and Mongolia, and was ambassador to Japan until the fall of 2008 when he was appointed High Commissioner to India with concurrent accreditation as Ambassador to Nepal and Bhutan.

Located in Pain Court, Laprise Farms Ltd has become the largest producer of Brussels sprouts in Canada as of 1998.

The 2018 International Plowing Match was held in Pain Court.

Education 

The Conseil scolaire catholique Providence (CSC) operates Francophone Catholic schools serving the community. It maintains its Chatham-Kent regional office in Pain Court.

Pain Court has an elementary and a secondary French-language (francophone) school. École Sainte-Catherine is a small elementary school located directly across the street from its sister school, École secondaire de Pain Court, a small high school with 270 students.

Wildlife 
Just west of Pain Court, on the shores of Lake St. Clair, an Environment Canada National Wildlife Area (St. Clair NWA) provides a variety of migrating birds with wetland habitat of international importance.  It is one of only 51 such sites in Canada.

References

External links 
Village de Pain Court website

Communities in Chatham-Kent